John Collins (born October 17, 1969 in Chapel Hill, North Carolina) is an American experimental theatre director and designer. He is the founder and artistic director of Elevator Repair Service (ERS) and has directed or co-directed all of its productions since 1991. Most notable among his work with ERS is Gatz, a verbatim performance of the entire text of F. Scott Fitzgerald's The Great Gatsby.

Between 1991 and 2006, Collins worked as a sound and lighting designer, primarily designing sound for The Wooster Group from 1993 to 2006.

Early life and education

Collins was born in Chapel Hill, North Carolina and grew up in Vidalia, Georgia. Collins attended Duke University in 1987-88 before transferring to Yale in 1989. He graduated cum laude with a combined degree in English and Theater Studies from Yale University in 1991. At Yale, he met future long-term collaborators and ERS co-founders including novelist James Hannaham, playwright/performer Rinne Groff, writer/producer Steve Bodow, choreographer Katherine Profeta, and performers Susie Sokol  and Leo Marks.

Early Work with ERS

Collins — along with Hannaham, Groff, Profeta, Colleen Werthmann, and Bradley Glenn — formed Elevator Repair Service in the fall of 1991. Shortly thereafter, they were joined by Steve Bodow, who also served as co-Artistic Director until 2002 before joining the writing staff of The Daily Show. The ensemble's first production was a version of Tristan Tzara's The First Celestial Adventure of Mr. Antipyrine, Fire Extinguisher.
 
Collins's early work with ERS was presented at downtown New York City venues such as Nada, Here Arts Center, The Ontological at St. Mark's Church, and Performance Space 122. The company's first original piece to tour Europe was Cab Legs (directed by Collins with Steve Bodow) an original work by the ensemble based loosely on a Tennessee Williams play and infused with choreography based on Bollywood dancing and Max Fleischer cartoons.

Gatz

Collins's best-known work with ERS is Gatz, an 8-hour performance of the entire text of The Great Gatsby. Work on the production began in 1999, but halted after ERS could not obtain performance rights to the book. In June 2004, Collins put together a 3-hour workshop performance of the first half of the novel at Brooklyn's Collapsible Hole venue.

In the fall of 2004, Collins approached the Fitzgerald Estate a second time to attempt to secure rights for a full production of Gatz, which by that time had incorporated the entire text of the novel. Negotiations continued for several months. Late in 2004, with plans in place for a short run, The Fitzgerald Estate informed the company that performance rights would not be granted. Notwithstanding, the ensemble continued with a limited number of open rehearsals at The Performing Garage in January 2005. Later that year, ERS was able to secure a licensing agreement with The Fitzgerald Estate to perform Gatz internationally and at select U.S. venues.

Gatz officially premiered at The Kunsten Festival des Arts in Brussels in 2006 and had its U.S. premiere in Minneapolis at The Walker Art Center later that year. Gatz had its New York debut at The Public Theater in 2010. Ben Brantley of The New York Times called Gatz “The most remarkable achievement in theater of the decade.” As of 2016, Gatz has played over 25 domestic and international venues. Extended runs have been presented at The Public Theater, The Sydney Opera House, The Noël Coward Theatre on London's West End and The American Repertory Theater. Collins has attended every performance.

Off-Broadway

By 2011, Collins's work with ERS was being seen regularly off-Broadway at New York Theatre Workshop (NYTW) and The Public Theater. Collins's first production on this scale was an adaptation of William Faulkner’s The Sound and the Fury (New York Theatre Workshop, 2008). ERS was company-in-residence at New York Theatre Workshop from 2006 to 2016. Other off-Broadway productions include The Select (The Sun Also Rises) at NYTW, Arguendo at The Public Theater, Fondly, Collette Richland (by Sibyl Kempson) at NYTW and remounts of both Gatz and The Sound and the Fury at The Public Theater. Collins's production of Measure for Measure with ERS premiered at The Public Theater in 2017.

International

Collins's work with ERS has been seen in 14 U.S. cities as well as in England, Scotland, Ireland, Belgium, Norway, Germany, The Netherlands, France, Portugal, Slovenia, Austria, Switzerland, Singapore, Australia, Chile and The United Arab Emirates. In 2012, Gatz played a limited run on London's West End at The Noël Coward Theatre. Other notable venues include The Holland Festival, The Vienna Festival, The Berlin Festival, The Adelaide Festival, and The Sydney Opera House.

Design Work

Upon arriving in New York after graduating from Yale, Collins began to work as a sound designer for Target Margin Theater. Between 1991 and 2006, he contributed sound work to seven Target Margin productions. Collins also worked as sound technician/operator on Richard Foreman’s productions The Mind King, and Samuel’s Major Problems. As a sound designer, Collins is best known for his work with The Wooster Group, contributing sound design and operator work on Frank Dell’s The Temptation of Saint Anthony, The Emperor Jones, Fish Story, The Hairy Ape, House/Lights, To You, The Birdie and Poor Theater.

Between 1991 and 1995, Collins designed lighting for several small productions off-off-Broadway in New York. He has also designed lighting for ERS productions No Great Society and Room Tone.

Origin of the Name Elevator Repair Service

In 1981, while on a trip to Ottawa, Canada to visit relatives, Collins, 11 at the time, answered a computer-based vocational aptitude questionnaire. The questionnaire was designed to assist unemployed workers at Canadian employment centers in choosing appropriate jobs. Among the several jobs the program suggested for Collins was “elevator repair technician.”

In 1991, Collins and James Hannaham discussed starting a theater company. They joked that, in order to make the old computer program's prediction come true, they’d have to name the company “Elevator Repair Service.” In October 1993, the company incorporated under the name Elevator Repair Service Theater, Inc. and have used it ever since.

Personal

Collins has lived in New York City since 1991. In 2002, he earned a private pilot's certificate and is rated to fly single-engine airplanes. In 2018, he married the journalist Lizzie O'Leary. They live in Brooklyn.

Awards
2010 Guggenheim Fellowship
2014 Doris Duke Performing Artist Award 
2011 United States Artists Donnelley Fellow 
2010 Elliot Norton Award for Best Director
2009 Foundation for Contemporary Arts Grants to Artists award
Lucille Lortel Award for Outstanding Director (Gatz, 2011)
2002 Bessie Award for Visual Design (Room Tone, 2002)

Elevator Repair Service Works Directed by Collins
Seagull (by Anton Chekhov, NYU/Skirball Center, 2022)
Ulysses (by James Joyce, Symphony Space, 2022)
Baldwin and Buckley at Cambridge (premiered at Philadelphia Fringe Festival, 2021)
Everyone’s Fine With Virginia Woolf (by Kate Scelsa, Abrons Arts Center, 2018)
Measure for Measure (The Public Theater, 2017)
Fondly, Collette Richland (by Sibyl Kempson, New York Theatre Workshop, 2015).
Arguendo (The Public Theater, 2013)
Shuffle (The New York Public Library, 2011).
The Sun Also Rises (New York Theatre Workshop, 2011).
Gatz (The Public Theater, 2010)
The Sound and the Fury (April Seventh, 1928) (New York Theatre Workshop, 2008)
No Great Society (P.S.122, 2006)
Gatz (World Premiere, Brussels, 2006)
Room Tone (P.S.122, 2002)
Highway to Tomorrow (HERE Arts Center, 2000).
Total Fictional Lie (P.S.122, 1998).
Cab Legs (P.S.122, 1997).
Shut-up I Tell You (I Said, Shut-up I Tell You) (P.S.122 1996).
McGurk: A Cautionary Tale (HERE Arts Center, 1994).
Language Instruction: Love Family vs. Andy Kaufman (HERE Arts Center, 1994).
Spine Check (Soho Rep, 1993).
Marx Brothers on Horseback Salad (Ohio Theater, 1992).
Mr. Antipyrine, Fire Extinguisher (Nada, 1991).

Collaborations with Ben Rubin/ The Office for Creative Research
Shuffle (New York Public Library, 2011), (Prague Quadrennial, 2011)
A Sort of Joy (Thousands of Exhausted Things) (The Museum of Modern Art, 2015)

References

Further reading
Bailes, Sara Jane. "Dislocations of Practice: Elevator Repair Service." Performance Theater and The Poetics of Failure, Routledge, 2010.

Collins, John. "Elevator Repair Service and The Wooster Group: Ensembles Surviving Themselves." Encountering Ensemble, edited by John Britton. Methuen, 2013.

Collins, John. "Performing Sound/ Sounding Space.” Theatre Noise: The Sound of Performance, edited by Lynn Kendrick and David Roesner, Cambridge Scholars Publishing.

Interview with Ross Brown. “Five Sound Designers in Their Own Words.” Sound: A Reader in Theater Practice, Palgrave MacMillan, 2010.

Interview with Coco Fusco. * BOMB''

External links
 Elevator Repair Service
 Target Margin
 The Wooster Group

Living people
1969 births